The 2021 UT Martin Skyhawks football team represented the University of Tennessee at Martin as a member of the Ohio Valley Conference (OVC) during the 2021 NCAA Division I FCS football season. Led by 16th-year head coach Jason Simpson, the Skyhawks compiled an overall record of 10–3 with a mark of 5–1 in conference play, winning the OVC title. UT Martin received an automatic berth to the NCAA Division I Football Championship playoffs, where they beat Missouri State in the first round before losing to the eventual national runner-up, Montana State, in the second round. The team played home games at Graham Stadium in Martin, Tennessee.

Schedule

References

UT Martin
UT Martin Skyhawks football seasons
Ohio Valley Conference football champion seasons
2021 NCAA Division I FCS playoff participants
UT Martin Skyhawks football